Peter Darcy Tannock  (born 2 October 1940) is a former academic and Australian rules football player, coach and administrator.

Tannock was made a Member of the Order of Australia (AM) in the 1996 Queen's Birthday Honours for "service to education, particularly through the Catholic Education Commission and Notre Dame University". He was awarded the Australian Sports Medal in 2000 for his service to Australian football and the Centenary Medal in 2001 for "service as Vice Chancellor, University of Notre Dame and to the Catholic Education Commission."

References

1940 births
Living people
Members of the Order of Australia
Australian rules football administrators
Australian rules footballers from Western Australia
East Perth Football Club players
West Australian Football Hall of Fame inductees